"Disenchanted" is a song co-written and recorded by American country music artist Michael Martin Murphey. It was released in April 1984 as the third single from the album The Heart Never Lies. The song peaked at number 12 on the U.S. Billboard Hot Country Singles and at number 11 on the Canadian RPM Country Tracks chart. It was written by Murphey, Jim Ed Norman and Chick Rains.

Music video
A music video directed by Francis Delia with James Lemmo as director of photography premiered in mid-1984.

Chart performance

References

1984 singles
Michael Martin Murphey songs
Songs written by Michael Martin Murphey
Songs written by Jim Ed Norman
Songs written by Chick Rains
Song recordings produced by Jim Ed Norman
Liberty Records singles
1983 songs